Concepción del Oro is one of the 58 municipalities in the Mexican state of Zacatecas. It is located on the northern part of the state and it is bounded by the municipalities of Mazapil and El Salvador; it also lies next to the states of Coahuila and San Luis Potosí.

Population
In the 2005 census Concepción del Oro reported a population of 11,857. Of these, 6,653 lived in the municipal seat and the remainder lived in surrounding rural communities.

Climate

Economy
Agriculture is one of the main economical activities in Concepción del Oro, it is based in temporary harvesting of mainly: beans, maize, oats, barley and wheat.

References

Municipalities of Zacatecas